The List of shipwrecks in 1776 includes some ships sunk, wrecked or otherwise lost during 1776.

January

4 January

5 January

6 January

7 January

8 January

14 January

16 January

23 January

27 January

29 January

Unknown date

February

7 February

20 February

21 February

Unknown date

March

12 March

21 March

22 March

24 March

27 March

Unknown date

April

4 April

9 April

19 April

26 April

Unknown date

May

3 May

18 May

19 May

Unknown date

June

27 June

29 June

Unknown date

July

4 July

6 July

9 July

Unknown date

August

Unknown date

September

3 September

6 September

16 September

19 September

22 September

Unknown date

October

8 October

11 October

12 October

13 October

22 October

29 October

Unknown date

November

1 November

11 November

12 November

16 November

17 November

20 November

21 November

22 November

24 November

30 November

Unknown date

December

23 December

30 December

31 December

Unknown date

Unknown date

References

1776